Alexander Chananau (November 11, 1915 – November 22, 2003) was an American politician who served in the New York State Assembly from 1958 to 1972.

He died on November 22, 2003, at age 88.

References

1915 births
2003 deaths
Democratic Party members of the New York State Assembly
Politicians from the Bronx
20th-century American politicians